Portland Magazine, also known as Portland Monthly since its inception, is a monthly magazine based in Maine.

Founded in October 1985 by Colin Sargent and Nancy Sargent of Sargent Publishing, Inc., it has featured notable writers such as Pulitzer Prize  winner Louis Simpson, Frederick Barthelme, Jason Brown, C. D. B. Bryan, Brian Daly, Dan Domench, Tess Gerritsen, Ann Hood, Sebastian Junger, Barbara Lefcowitz, Diane Lefer, Tomislav Longinovic, Mameve Medwed, Rick Moody, and Janwillem van de Wetering.

In September 1987, the publication  broke the story that van Gogh's painting Irises was about to be auctioned. The painting was auctioned at Sotheby's for a record $53.9 million.

Another 1980s feature, "Pizza Diplomacy", reported crews from Glasnost-era Soviet fishing trawlers off the coast of Maine were radioing in orders for pizzas in Rockland, and having them sent out in launches. Portland Magazine writer Kevin LeDuc went out with a pizza order, interviewed crew members, and photographed the captain in his cabin.

In recent years, the perfect-bound glossy has regularly eclipsed 200 pages. A strong emphasis on dramatic photography and interviews with prominent Mainers including Patrick Dempsey, Liv Tyler, Stephen King, Rachel Nichols, Seth Wescott, Ian Crocker and more and has resulted in 40 American Graphic Design awards in 2007-2008.  Portland Magazine is a grand prize winner for Best Cover at the Maggie Zine Awards sponsored by Newsstand Resource.

In June 2017, Portland Magazine set an all-time record with a page count of 304 in their Summerguide 2017.

The magazine holds the registered U.S. trademark Portland Monthly from the U.S. Patent & Trademark Office, as well as the domain www.portlandmonthly.com.

Further reading
Graphic Design USA, New York: Graphic Design USA
NewsStand Resource, Greensboro: NewsStand Resource

References

External links
 Portland Monthly Magazine
 City Hall of Portland, Maine
 Portland, Maine Recreation and Facilities Management

Local interest magazines published in the United States
Monthly magazines published in the United States
Magazines established in 1985
Mass media in Portland, Maine
Magazines published in Maine
1985 establishments in Maine